The Ministry of Public Health and Hygiene is the ministry of health of Mali. It has its headquarters in the capital city Bamako.

History
, the Minister of Health and Public Hygiene is Samba Sow.

See also 
 Health in Mali

References

External links 
 

Government of Mali
Health in Mali
Mali